Major General Ray Wehnes Barker (December 10, 1889 – June 28, 1974) was a United States Army officer of the Allied Forces, and served in the European Theater of Operations during World War II. Barker was a key member of the combined United States-British group, which became known as COSSAC (Chief of Staff to the Supreme Allied Commander). This group planned the Battle of Normandy, codenamed "Operation Overlord", also known as D-Day, which liberated Nazi-occupied France. He served as the Deputy Chief of Staff of the European Theater from 1943–1944, and Deputy Chief of Staff for Supreme Headquarters Allied Expeditionary Force (SHAEF).

Early and military professional life
Ray Barker was born in Elmira, New York and enlisted in the Army first serving with the 15th Cavalry from 1910 to 1913. He was commissioned as an officer in the cavalry in 1913, later participating in the Punitive Expedition into Mexico (Pancho Villa Expedition) from 1916 to 1917. Thereafter, he transferred to the field artillery and accompanied the 13th Field Artillery to France in World War I. He served in the Marne-Vesle and Meuse-Argonne offensives.

In 1928, he graduated from the Command and General Staff School, and in 1940 from the Army War College.

He was the commanding officer of 31st Field Artillery from June 1940 to April 1941. He commanded the 30th Field Artillery from June 1941 until April 1942. After promotion to brigadier general in July 1942, he later became the Deputy Chief of Staff of the European Theater from 1943–1944, and Deputy Chief of Staff for Supreme Headquarters Allied Expeditionary Force. He was promoted to major general in June 1943. In January 1946 he assumed command of the 78th Infantry Division, headquartered in Berlin, succeeding Major General Edwin P. Parker Jr. He was commander supervising demilitarization of Germany until the deactivation of the 78th in May 1946 (see: commandants of Berlin American Zone). General Baker retired from the military in February 1947.

Contributions to Overlord
Two of Barker's notable actions in the Overlord planning involved maintaining American involvement when significant disagreements arose between Americans and British military planners, which could have resulted in withdrawal of America support for the operation.

While Overlord was planned, the expected amount of enemy resistance after aerial and naval bombardment was unclear.  Overlord initially stated the land invasion in France could not succeed against more than twelve divisions of enemy troops; Barker predicted this would make the invasion unpalatable and risk American opposition.   Barker's concern was correct and lead to opposition from the Joint Chiefs in America.  After further discussion and clarifications from Barker, the America government's support was accomplished.

Tensions between Americans and British governments again arose due to how involved a battlefield commander should be in such an invasion, particularly when a multi-national force is commanded by a single battlefield commander. Barker as the acting Chief of Staff to the Supreme Allied Commander, was able to solidify agreement between the countries of how this should be handled.

Decorations
His decorations included the Distinguished Service Medal, Legion of Merit, Bronze Star Medal, and Soldier's Medal.

Negotiations
In 1945, Barker, as the SHAEF Assistant Chief of Staff for Personnel (G-1), was the officer responsible for recovery of Allied POWs.

Between 16 and 22 May 1945, Major General Barker and Lieutenant General K.D. Golubev, representing the Soviet repatriation authority, met at Halle, Germany. The general principles agreed to at Yalta provided the framework for the Halle discussions. With respect to the return of western Allied prisoners, the Halle meeting centered on working out the administrative details for the prompt release and return to SHAEF control of British and American POWs, using available air or motor transport.

Despite the seemingly straightforward nature of this problem, the Soviets prolonged the negotiations, citing practical and administrative obstacles and tying rapid release of American, British, and other Allied prisoners of war (POWs) to repatriation of all Soviet prisoners and displaced persons in the West, many of whom did not want to return to the Soviet Union. The conferees finally reached agreement on a plan in the early morning hours of 22 May. They finalized delivery and reception points for each side, transportation plans, daily transit capacities of each of the reception-delivery points, and other details. Barker and Golubev signed the Halle Agreement on 22 May 1945. However, most Americans liberated by the Soviets in central Germany and along the Baltic coast, had been exchanged by local arrangement prior to implementation of the Halle Agreement on 23 May.

Post army career – The Manlius School

After suffering a back injury, Barker was forced to retire.  In the hospital he was visited regularly by Eisenhower including discussions of post-career options, where Eisenhower ultimately referred him to a position as a headmaster. Barker served as the headmaster at The Manlius School, an independent, non-sectarian, college-preparatory military school for boys in the town of Manlius in Central New York. Barker served from 1946 until 1960.

During this tenure, he accompanied retired general Lucius Clay on a trip to Berlin, Germany, for the dedication of that city's Liberty Bell on October 24, 1950.

Upon his death in 1974 he was buried at Arlington National Cemetery.

References

External links
 
 1992–1996 Findings Of The WWII Working Group
 Durston, Harry C., History of The Manlius School. 1966
Generals of World War II
United States Army Officers 1939–1945

Further reading

 

1889 births
1974 deaths
United States Army Cavalry Branch personnel
United States Army Field Artillery Branch personnel
United States Army War College alumni
People from Elmira, New York
Burials at Arlington National Cemetery
United States Army Command and General Staff College alumni
Recipients of the Legion of Merit
Manlius Pebble Hill School
Military personnel from New York City
United States Army personnel of World War I
United States Army generals of World War II
United States Army generals